Marienhof is a German soap opera, first shown on 1 October 1992 on German TV channel, Das Erste. It started as a weekly series, before becoming a daily programme on 2 January 1995. The show was cancelled in February 2011 and aired its last episode on 15 June 2011.

The show focuses on the everyday life of the residents of the Marienhof, a fictional suburb in Cologne. Over the years, the show became known for tackling several social issues, such as homosexuality, homelessness, private bankruptcy, rape, drug abuse, AIDS, child abuse, suicide, cancer, adultery and murder.

Background
Marienhof is produced by Bavaria Fernsehproduktion GmbH in Munich. The series is set in another German city, Cologne. The first 52 episodes of the show were 45 minutes long and were shown every Tuesday and Thursday but from episode 53 onwards, this was shortened to 25 minutes. On 2 January 1995, Marienhof was joined by Verbotene Liebe in the daily soaps schedule in Germany.

The show has produced 4,053 episodes and has starred 100 major actors, 4,000 minor actors and about 5,000 guest stars. 
Of the many roles in the series, Inge Busch, played by Viktoria Brams, was the only one from the beginning to the end. In the show, there have been 25 weddings, 48 deaths and 13 births. The theme tune of Marienhof is the song "Es wird viel passieren" by S.O.S.

Setting
Marienhof is set in a fictional Cologne suburb, with businesses and shops like any normal suburb. Settings include a shopping mall, cafes, a secondary school, a discotheque and the houses of the different characters. 
The characters of the soap were bar and shop owners, housewives, businessmen, craftsmen, doctors, students and teachers.

Overall, the plot - in contrast to the plot of another German soap opera Verbotene Liebe - was dominated by the petite bourgeoisie instead of the wealthy nobility, similar to the other well-known day-time German soaps like Unter Uns and Gute Zeiten, schlechte Zeiten.

According to Günter Struve, program director of Das Erste between 1992 and 2008:

Production

Concept and initial framework proposals

In April 1989, the Bavaria Film / Film West working group, headed by Georg Feil, presented a first paper in which the series, which did not yet have an independent working title, was presented. Accordingly, a classic 25-minute soap with stories and events from private and work life was planned, which, however, was not copied from foreign formats - as was the case with Lindenstraße and later in Gute Zeiten, schlechte Zeiten, but rather from German authors should be written. The series envisaged three narrative strands interwoven like a braid based on the Anglo-Saxon model, i. H. Three independent stories should be told per episode, which nonetheless have points of contact.

A script editor and two teams of five authors should ensure that this concept is adhered to. The working group initially developed three suggestions for locations: the clover leaf, the department store and the hospital in the middle of the city. After the series paper had been processed, the materials clover leaf and hospital were discarded; what remained was a suggestion for the department store, which was presented to the ARD cross-country series project group in May 1989. After almost all editors had voted for a further development of the department store material, extensive research was carried out on cross-country productions in other European countries. In July, another revised paper for the series was presented with explanations of the dramaturgical concept and the planned manuscript production, in which the department store material was expanded and rounded off. Ultimately, however, the Arnhem department store was rejected by the ARD project group, as it was feared that this location would not offer enough scope for private stories and human fates, which is why all previous suggestions for characters were rejected.

Cast

Main cast members

Recurring cast members

References

External links
Marienhof-Spoiler 

German television soap operas
Television shows set in Cologne
Das Erste original programming
1992 German television series debuts
2011 German television series endings
2000s German television series
German-language television shows
Rape in television